USS Miami (SSN-755) was a Los Angeles-class submarine of the United States Navy. It was the third vessel of the U.S. Navy to be named after Miami, Florida. Miami was the forty-fourth Los Angeles-class (688) submarine and the fifth Improved Los Angeles-class (688I) submarine to be built and commissioned. The contract to build it was awarded to the Electric Boat division of General Dynamics Corporation in Groton, Connecticut, on 28 November 1983, and its keel was laid down on 24 October 1986. It was launched on 12 November 1988 and commissioned on 30 June 1990 with Commander Thomas W. Mader in command.

On 1 March 2012, Miami arrived at the Portsmouth Naval Shipyard in Kittery, Maine, for a scheduled 20-month Engineered Overhaul (EOH) and system upgrades. On 23 May, a shipyard employee started a fire that spread to crew living, command and control, and torpedo spaces. Repairs were initially estimated to require three years and $450 million, an estimate later revised to a range of $450 million to $700 million.

On 6 August 2013, Navy officials said that due to budget cuts, the vessel would not be repaired. The submarine was placed on the inactive list, then decommissioned on 28 March 2014.

History

1999
Miami became the first submarine to conduct combat operations in two theaters since World War II (Operation Desert Fox and Operation Allied Force).

2012 fire

At 5:41 p.m. EDT on 23 May 2012, fire crews were called with a report of a fire on Miami while it was being overhauled at the Portsmouth Naval Shipyard in Kittery, Maine. At the time, the submarine was in the second month of a scheduled 20-month maintenance cycle, indicating that it was undergoing an extensive overhaul called an "Engineering Overhaul". The national media reported that seven firefighters had been injured. One crew member suffered broken ribs when he fell through a hole left by removed deck plates during the fire. It took firefighters 12 hours to extinguish it.

Initially, the U.S. Navy reported that the fire started when an industrial vacuum cleaner used "to clean worksites on the sub after shipyard workers' shifts" sucked up a heat source that ignited debris inside the vacuum. On 23 July 2012, however, civilian painter and sandblaster Casey J. Fury was indicted on two counts of arson after confessing to starting the fire. Fury said he lit rags on a berthing compartment's top bunk so he could get out of work early. On 15 March 2013, he was sentenced to more than 17 years in federal prison and ordered to pay $400 million in restitution.

The debate over whether to repair or scrap Miami lasted more than a year. Within a month of the fire, Maine Senators Susan Collins and Olympia Snowe advocated repairing the submarine. In July 2012, Navy leaders asked Congress to add $220 million to the operations and maintenance budget for emergent and unfunded ship repairs. In August, the Navy decided to repair the boat for an estimated total cost of $450 million. The repair cost was expected to be trimmed by using spare parts from the recently decommissioned  and by repairing rather than replacing damaged hull sections, as had been done with another Los Angeles-class boat, . But both of these approaches proved unworkable with the newer Miami. As well, a detailed assessment raised the estimated repair bill to $700 million.

On 6 August 2013, the U.S. Navy announced its intention to decommission Miami, concluding the cost was more than it could afford in a time of budget cuts. The sub was officially decommissioned on 28 March 2014, to be disposed of via the nuclear Ship-Submarine Recycling Program.

Previous mottos
"Can do, will do, glad to": Used before Operation Desert Fox.
"First to fire. Twice to fire": Adopted after returning from the 1998–99 deployment.

In popular culture
USS Miami is one of two vessels featured in Submarine: A Guided Tour Inside a Nuclear Warship, a 1993 non-fiction book by Tom Clancy.

Gallery

References

External links

 at the Naval Vessel Register
USS Miami command histories – Naval History & Heritage Command: 19901991199219931994199519981999200020012002

Los Angeles-class submarines
Cold War submarines of the United States
Nuclear submarines of the United States Navy
Ships built in Groton, Connecticut
1988 ships
Ship fires
Maritime incidents in 2012
Arson in Maine
United States submarine accidents